Durak or Dowrak in Iran, may refer to:

Chaharmahal and Bakhtiari Province
Durak, Chaharmahal and Bakhtiari
Shahrak-e Durak, Chaharmahal and Bakhtiari Province, Iran
Durak Qanbari, Chaharmahal and Bakhtiari Province, Iran
Durak Rahman, Chaharmahal and Bakhtiari Province, Iran
Durak-e Shapuri, Chaharmahal and Bakhtiari Province, Iran
Durak-e Olya, Chaharmahal and Bakhtiari Province, Iran
Durak-e Sofla, Chaharmahal and Bakhtiari Province, Iran

Fars Province
Durakatabak, a village in Rostam County
Durakmadineh, a village in Rostam County

Isfahanan Province
Durak, Fereydunshahr, a village in Fereydunshahr County
Durak, Lenjan, a village in Lenjan County

Khuzestan Province
Durak, Susan-e Gharbi, a village in Izeh County
Durak, Susan-e Sharqi, a village in Izeh County

Kohgiluyeh and Boyer-Ahmad Province
Durak, Kohgiluyeh and Boyer-Ahmad (دوراك - Dūrāk), a village in Bahmai County

Lorestan Province
Durak, Zaz va Mahru, a village in Zaz va Mahru District, Aligudarz County, Lorestan Province, Iran

See also
Durak Zenan (disambiguation)